The Illinois Korean War State Memorial honors the 1,748 Illinois residents who are listed as killed or listed as missing in action during the Korean War.  Dedicated in June 1996, the Memorial centers on the names of the dead or missing carved on slabs of granite.  Mounted on the granite base with inscribed names is a twelve-foot-high bronze bell.  The bell encloses a carillon system.  The bell and base create four niches, each representing a branch of the Korean War-era armed services.

The carillon system plays brief music programs for visitors, and there is a dedicated parking area.

Illinois State Historic Sites
Monuments and memorials in Illinois
Tourist attractions in Springfield, Illinois
Buildings and structures in Springfield, Illinois
1996 sculptures
1996 establishments in Illinois
Granite sculptures in Illinois
Outdoor sculptures in Illinois